Emilio Gola (1851–1923) was an Italian painter.

Biography
Born in Milan into a noble family, Gola was encouraged to develop his interest in art in his adolescence by his father, a dilettante painter. He graduated in industrial engineering from the Milan Polytechnic in 1873 and devoted himself to painting under the guidance of Sebastiano De Albertis. His training also involved frequent trips to Paris and the Netherlands.

He made his debut at the 1879 Exposition of Fine Arts at the Brera Academy and afterwards participated regularly in national exhibitions, but obtained his greatest official recognition at the European level. By the 1880s he was an esteemed portrait who depicted women of the Milanese nobility in their fashionable, worldly dimension but with a vigorously naturalistic approach. His portraits were accompanied by a rich repertoire of views of Milan and the countryside of Brianza in bright colours that were to constitute his stylistic hallmark. Active in the region of Liguria and Venice, he focused in his late period on seascapes distinguished by great formal synthesis and expressive intensity. One of his pupils was Alberto Malaspina (painter) (1853–1903).

References
 Elena Lissoni, Emilio Gola, online catalogue Artgate by Fondazione Cariplo, 2010, CC BY-SA (source for the first revision of this article).

Other projects

1851 births
1923 deaths
19th-century Italian painters
19th-century Italian male artists
Italian male painters
20th-century Italian painters
Painters from Milan
20th-century Italian male artists